There are at least 7 named lakes and reservoirs in Yellowstone County, Montana.

Lakes
 Alkali Pond, el. 
 Lake Elmo, el. 
 Broadview Pond, el. 
 Twin Lakes, el.

Reservoirs
 Anita Reservoir, el. 
 Anita Reservoir, el. 
 Rattlesnake Reservoir, el.

See also
 List of lakes in Montana

Notes

Bodies of water of Yellowstone County, Montana
Yellowstone